= Lake Placid Olympics =

Lake Placid, New York has been the host to two Winter Olympic Games:

- 1932 Winter Olympics, III Olympic Winter Games
- 1980 Winter Olympics, XIII Olympic Winter Games
